This section of List of Liberty ships is a sortable list of Liberty ships—cargo ships built in the United States during World War II—with names beginning with G through Je.

G through Je

References

Sources
 

Lists of Liberty ships
 G